Kaniravutharkulam is a neighbourhood in Erode district of Tamil Nadu state in the peninsular India. There is a pond in this area and is named as Kaniravuthar pond, and hence the name of the area, Kaniravutharkulam.

There is a proposal to establish a Bus stand here in Kaniravutharkulam near Soolai, where buses ply from Sathamangalam, Gobichettipalayam, Kavundapadi, etc. stay for a while.

References 

Neighbourhoods in Erode